The Caine Mutiny is a 1951 Pulitzer Prize-winning novel by Herman Wouk. The novel grew out of Wouk's personal experiences aboard two destroyer-minesweepers in the Pacific Theater in World War II. Among its themes, it deals with the moral and ethical decisions made at sea by ship captains and other officers. The mutiny of the title is legalistic, not violent, and takes place during Typhoon Cobra, in December 1944. The court-martial that results provides the dramatic climax to the plot.

Plot summary

The story is told through the eyes of Willis Seward "Willie" Keith, an affluent but callow young graduate of Princeton University. Following a mediocre living as a nightclub piano player, he signs up for midshipman school at Columbia University with the United States Navy to avoid being drafted into the United States Army during World War II. He endures inner conflicts over his relationship with his domineering mother and with May Wynn, a beautiful red-haired nightclub singer, the daughter of Italian immigrants. After barely surviving a series of misadventures that earn him the highest number of demerits in his class, he is commissioned as an ensign in the Naval Reserve and assigned to the destroyer minesweeper U.S.S. Caine, an obsolete warship converted from a post-World War I-era destroyer.

Willie, with a low opinion of the Navy, misses his ship when it leaves on a combat assignment. Rather than catch up with it, he plays piano for an admiral who has taken a shine to him. He has second thoughts after reading a last letter from his father, who has died of melanoma. But he soon forgets his guilt in the round of parties at the admiral's house. Eventually, he reports aboard the Caine. The ensign immediately disapproves of the ship's decaying condition and slovenly crew. He attributes these conditions to a slackness of discipline by the ship's longtime captain, Lieutenant Commander William De Vriess.

Willie's lackadaisical attitude toward what he considers menial duties brings about a humiliating clash with De Vriess when Willie forgets to decode a communique announcing that De Vriess will soon be relieved. De Vriess is relieved by Lieutenant Commander Philip Francis Queeg, a strong, by-the-book figure, whom Willie at first believes to be just what the rusty Caine and its rough-necked crew needs. But Queeg has never handled a ship like this before, and he soon makes errors that he is unwilling to admit. The Caine is sent to San Francisco for an overhaul, in an admiral's hope that the captain will make further mistakes elsewhere. Before the ship departs, Queeg browbeats his officers into selling their liquor rations to him. In a breach of regulations, Queeg smuggles the liquor off the ship, and when it is lost, he blackmails Willie into paying for it. Willie sees May on leave, and after unsuccessfully attempting to seduce her, decides he has no future with a woman of a lower social class. He resolves to let the relationship die by not replying to her letters.

As the Caine begins its missions under his command, Queeg loses the respect of the crew and the loyalty of the wardroom through a series of incidents. Tensions aboard the ship cause Queeg to isolate himself from the other officers, who snub him as unworthy, believing him an oppressive coward. At one point, during the invasion of Kwajalein, Queeg is ordered to escort low-lying landing craft to their line of departure. But instead, Queeg orders the Caine to throw over a yellow dye marker to mark the spot, and the Caine hastily leaves the battle area. The officers nickname Queeg "Old Yellowstain", a nickname that implies cowardice.

The dynamic, intellectual communications officer, Lieutenant Thomas Keefer, who had initially coined the nickname of "Old Yellowstain" for Queeg, suggests to the Caine's executive officer, the dutiful Lieutenant Stephen Maryk, that Queeg might be mentally ill. Keefer directs Maryk to "Section 184" of the Navy Regulations, under which a subordinate can relieve a commanding officer in extraordinary circumstances.

Climax

Maryk keeps a secret log of Queeg's eccentric behavior and decides to bring it to the attention of Admiral Halsey, commanding the Third Fleet. Keefer reluctantly supports Maryk, then gets cold feet and backs out, warning Maryk that his actions will be seen as mutiny. Soon afterward, the Caine is caught in a typhoon, an ordeal that sinks three destroyers. At the height of the storm, Queeg's paralysis of action convinces Maryk that he must relieve the captain of command to prevent the loss of the ship. Willie, as officer of the deck, supports the decision. Maryk turns Caine into the wind and rides out the storm.  This sequence of events and its resolution marks the climax and most thrilling portion of the novel, and it parallels Wouk's experiences as executive officer aboard the destroyer minesweeper USS Southard in Okinawa, during Typhoon Ida in September 1945.

The court-martial

Maryk is tried by court-martial for "conduct to the prejudice of good order and discipline" instead of "making a mutiny". Willie and John Stilwell, the enlisted helmsman (he is a gunner's mate second class) during the typhoon, are to be tried depending on the outcome of Maryk's trial. In the courtroom, Keefer distances himself from any responsibility for the relief. Lieutenant Barney Greenwald, a naval aviator who was an attorney in civilian life, represents Maryk. His opinion, after the captain was found sane by three Navy psychiatrists, is that Maryk was legally unjustified in relieving Queeg. Despite his own disgust with Maryk's and Willie's actions, Greenwald decides to take the case after deducing Keefer's role.

During the trial, Greenwald unrelentingly cross-examines Queeg until he is overcome by stress. Greenwald's attacks on Queeg result in Maryk's acquittal and the dropping of charges against Willie. Maryk, who had aspired to a career in the regular Navy, is later sent to command a Landing Craft Infantry, a humiliation that ruins his Naval career ambitions. Queeg is transferred to a naval supply depot in Iowa.

At a party celebrating both the acquittal and Keefer's success at selling his novel to a publisher, an intoxicated Greenwald calls Keefer a coward. He tells the gathering that he feels ashamed of having destroyed Queeg on the stand because Queeg and the other regular armed-forces officers all did the necessary duty of guarding America in the peacetime Navy, which people like Keefer saw as beneath them; and that their disdain for and subsequent mistreatment of Queeg is what led to his inability to take action during the typhoon. Greenwald asserts that men like Queeg kept Greenwald's Jewish mother from being "melted down into a bar of soap" by the Nazis. He calls Keefer, not Maryk, "the true author of 'The Caine Mutiny'". Greenwald throws a glass of champagne, "the yellow wine", in Keefer's face, thereby bringing the term "Old Yellowstain" full circle, first as a derogatory name for Queeg, and then back to the novelist.

Willie returns to the Caine in the last days of the Okinawa campaign as its executive officer. Keefer is now the captain, and his behavior as captain is similar to Queeg's. The Caine is struck by a kamikaze, an event in which Willie discovers that he has matured into a naval officer. Keefer panics and orders the ship abandoned, but Willie remains aboard and rescues the situation by heroically dousing the fires.

Keefer, discharged after the war ends, is ashamed of his cowardly behavior during the kamikaze attack, especially because his brother Roland had died saving his ship from kamikaze fire. Willie becomes the last captain of the Caine. He receives a Bronze Star Medal for his actions following the kamikaze—and a letter of reprimand for his part in unlawfully relieving Queeg. The findings of the court-martial have been overturned after a review by higher authority. Willie agrees in retrospect that the relief was unjustified and probably unnecessary.

Willie keeps the Caine afloat during another typhoon and brings it back to Bayonne, New Jersey, for decommissioning after the end of the war. On reflection, he decides to ask May (now a blonde and using her real name of Marie Minotti) to marry him. However, this will not be as easy as he once thought, as she is now the girlfriend of a popular bandleader, for whom she is the vocalist. The book ends with Willie's and May's situation unresolved, but Willie is still determined to convince May to become his wife.

Historical background

Wouk served during World War II aboard two destroyer-minesweepers (DMS) converted from World War I-era s,  being the first and  being the second. (Wouk uses the latter name for one of his characters in the novel, Captain Randolph Patterson Southard. Also, in an allusion to history professor Jacques Barzun of his alma mater, Columbia University, Wouk also has Queeg refer to a previous assignment he had on a ship named Barzun.) USS Caine is a fictional Clemson-class DMS conversion.

The Clemson class was named for Midshipman Henry A. Clemson, lost at sea on December 8, 1846, during the Mexican war, when the brig  capsized off Veracruz in a sudden squall while chasing a blockade runner. In November 1842, the Somers was the scene of the only recorded conspiracy to mutiny in U.S. Naval history when three members of the crew—a midshipman, a boatswain's mate, and a seaman—were clapped in irons and subsequently hanged for planning a takeover of the vessel.

Many of the incidents and plot details are autobiographical. Like both Keefer and Willie, Wouk rose through the ship's wardroom of Zane from assistant communications officer to first lieutenant.  As executive officer of the Southard, Wouk was recommended to captain the ship home to the United States at the end of the war before it was beached at Okinawa in September 1945, during Typhoon Louise.

Wouk was serving aboard the USS Zane in December 1944, and though his ship did not experience much or any of the effects of Typhoon Cobra, as did the fictional Caine during this time, the American Third Fleet had many ships lost or damaged in the Philippine Sea during the storm. The Zane, however, was grounded during a heavy rain squall while disembarking her troops in the Russell Islands around June 1943, and as mentioned earlier, while serving as executive officer, Wouk offered to captain the Clemson-class DMS USS Southard home in September 1945, before she was grounded off Okinawa by Typhoon Louise, a serious storm that damaged over 20 American ships.

The novel also describes the fictional Caine as having been struck by a kamikaze, which caused relatively minor damage, while Keefer was in command during the Battle of Lingayen Gulf. This did in fact happen to the Southard on January 6, 1945, although Wouk was not aboard at the time, as he was still serving on the Zane.

The name for the USS Caine came from the bible verse involving Cain killing his brother Abel, and is a reference to the banishment and resulting isolation felt by Cain as a result of his murdering his brother.  The biblical Cain felt a similar sense of isolation and hopelessness that Willie Keith feels during his time aboard the Caine.  Like Cain's exile, Willie Keith is nearly exiled from the Navy when he is given multiple demerits for infractions during his midshipman's training and is told another demerit of any kind will result in his expulsion. While supporting the efforts of the minesweepers and underwater demolition teams, another Clemson-class destroyer, the USS Kane, served in the Marshall Islands and at Saipan in the Marianas at the same time as Wouk's ship Zane.  The destroyer Kane may have prompted Wouk to think of the biblical Caine as a fitting name for his fictional ship.

Reception

The Caine Mutiny reached the top of the New York Times best seller list on August 12, 1951, after 17 weeks on the list, replacing From Here to Eternity.  It remained atop the list for 33 weeks until March 30, 1952, when it was replaced by My Cousin Rachel. It moved back to first place on May 25, 1952, and remained another 15 weeks, before being supplanted by The Silver Chalice, and last appeared on August 23, 1953, after 122 weeks on the list.

Adaptations
In 1954, Columbia Pictures released the film The Caine Mutiny, starring Humphrey Bogart as Queeg in a widely acclaimed performance that earned him the third and final Academy Award nomination of his career.

After the novel's success, Wouk adapted the court-martial sequence into a full-length, two-act Broadway play, The Caine Mutiny Court Martial. Directed by Charles Laughton, it was a success on the stage in 1954, opening five months before the release of the film and starring Lloyd Nolan as Queeg, John Hodiak as Maryk, and Henry Fonda as Greenwald. It has been revived twice on Broadway, and was presented on television live in 1955, under the direction of Franklyn J. Schaffner, and in 1988, as a made-for-television film, directed by Robert Altman.

In 1988, the stage script was translated into Chinese by Ying Ruocheng, a famous Chinese actor, director, playwright and Vice Minister of Culture. At Ying's invitation, Charlton Heston directed the translated play in a successful run at the Beijing People's Art Theatre, opening on October 18, 1988. The play was revived in 2006, again under Heston, and has been revived there twice more (2009, 2012), since his death.

In 2022, a new adaptation directed by William Friedkin was reported to be in the works. Kiefer Sutherland will portray Lt. Commander Queeg and the screenplay will be similar to Wouk's stage adaptation. Friedkin plans to modernize the film, involving the Strait of Hormuz leading to Iran, as opposed to the original's WWII-setting. Filming is planned for January 2023.

See also 
 “The Canine Mutiny" – an episode of The Simpsons
 "The Novocaine Mutiny" - an episode of M*A*S*H
 Sea in culture
 “Queeg” – an episode of the UK sitcom series Red Dwarf
 Typhoon Cobra (1944), the typhoon described in the book
 Tootsie, 1982 film starring Dustin Hoffman: in the beginning of the movie Hoffman’s character is on stage reciting Barney Greenwald’s monologue from the end of the book.

References

External links 
 
 Study Guide of Herman Wouk's The Caine Mutiny  from SparkNotes
 United States Navy Regulations, 1990 (Article 184 is now Section 1088)

1951 American novels
American novels adapted into films
Doubleday (publisher) books
Fiction about mutinies
Novels by Herman Wouk
Pulitzer Prize for Fiction-winning works
Novels set during World War II
Novels set in Columbia University
Military courtroom dramas
Courtroom novels
Works about ships
Fiction about law
Courts-martial in fiction